Potter Hall is a historic home located at Williston, Caroline County, Maryland, United States. It is an early-19th-century, Federal-influenced house facing the Choptank River. The house was constructed in three sections: a tall -story Flemish bond brick structure built about 1808 adjoining a lower -story, two-bay-wide central section built about 1750, also of Flemish bond brick, then a frame single-story kitchen wing added in 1930. Each of the three sections has a gable roof. Potter Hall was originally settled by Zabdiel Potter, who in the mid-18th century built a wharf and the small brick house. He developed Potter's Landing into a key early port for the shipping of tobacco to Baltimore.

Potter Hall was listed on the National Register of Historic Places in 1982.

References

External links
, including photo from 1996, at Maryland Historical Trust

Houses on the National Register of Historic Places in Maryland
Historic American Buildings Survey in Maryland
Federal architecture in Maryland
Houses completed in 1808
Houses in Caroline County, Maryland
National Register of Historic Places in Caroline County, Maryland